In enzymology, a glucarate O-hydroxycinnamoyltransferase is an enzyme that catalyzes the chemical reaction

sinapoyl-CoA + glucarate  CoA + O-sinapoylglucarate

Thus, the two substrates of this enzyme are sinapoyl-CoA and glucarate, whereas its two products are CoA and O-sinapoylglucarate.

This enzyme belongs to the family of transferases, specifically those acyltransferases transferring groups other than aminoacyl groups.  The systematic name of this enzyme class is sinapoyl-CoA:glucarate O-(hydroxycinnamoyl)transferase.

References

 

EC 2.3.1
Enzymes of unknown structure